Eulepidotis caudatula is a moth of the family Erebidae first described by Gottlieb August Wilhelm Herrich-Schäffer in 1854. It is found in the Neotropics, including Suriname.

References

Moths described in 1854
caudatula